Ken Hill (born 4 April 1950) is a former  Australian rules footballer who played with North Melbourne in the Victorian Football League (VFL).

Notes

External links

Living people
1950 births
Australian rules footballers from Victoria (Australia)
North Melbourne Football Club players